Charlie Campbell (born January 5, 1988 in Mundelein, Illinois) is an American soccer player.

Career

College and amateur
Campbell attended Mundelein High School and played club soccer for the Chicago Sockers, before going on to play college soccer at Virginia Tech. He started in 19 games for the Hokies during his freshman season in 2006, finishing the season with one goal and seven assists and being named to the All-ACC Freshman team. In 2007, he recorded a 'TEAM' save in preserving the Hokies' 1-0 win at then-No. 2 Connecticut in the NCAA Men's College Cup Regional Final. Campbell started at left back for the Hokies' first ever Final Four appearance. In 2008, Campbell suffered a knee injury and was awarded a medical redshirt. In 2010, Campbell transferred to the University of Louisville for his final year of eligibility and led the Cardinals to their first  College Cup Final Four appearance in school history. Campbell finished third on the team in points registering six goals and two assists. After being crowned the 2010 Big East regular season and 2010 Big East tournament champions, the Cardinals entered the NCAA tournament as the number one overall seed with an undefeated record. The Cardinals lost to The University of Akron in the NCAA championship 1-0. Campbell was named to the 2010 College Cup All-tournament team and is the first player in NCAA Soccer history to play in two NCAA Final Four's with two separate schools. Campbell graduated with a bachelor's degree in Finance from Virginia Tech and completed his Master's of Science from the University of Louisville.

Professional
Campbell was drafted in the second round, 35th overall, of the 2011 MLS SuperDraft by FC Dallas. He spent the entire preseason with the 2010 MLS Cup runners-up, and participated in the 2011 Disney Pro Soccer Classic, but was not offered a contract by the team.

Campbell signed for Orlando City of the USL Professional Division in May 2011. He made his professional debut on May 25, 2011 in a 2-0 win over the Richmond Kickers. After signing, Campbell made 13 appearances in the remaining 18 games during the 2011 USL PRO season. Orlando City won the 2011 regular season and 2011 USL Pro Championship with Campbell playing a key role in the championship game. Campbell also appeared in two U.S. Open Cup matches and made appearances in both the Bolton Wanderers and Newcastle United exhibition matches.

In 2012, Campbell appeared in 20 of 24 league matches for USL regular season champions Orlando City. Campbell also started both U.S. Open Cup matches for City while notching two assists. Following his one-goal and five-assist campaign, Campbell was awarded Clubman of the Year  by manager Adrian Heath.

On January 21, 2013 Campbell signed a seven-month deal with Ljungskile SK in the Swedish second tier Superettan after trialing with the club for two weeks. His friend Patrick Hopkins, who plays defender for Ljungskile, had recommended Campbell to the club. Campbell suffered a career ending knee injury prior to the club's third match of the season.

Honors

Orlando City
USL Pro (1): 2011

References

External links
 Louisville bio
 Virginia Tech bio

1988 births
Living people
American soccer players
Virginia Tech Hokies men's soccer players
Louisville Cardinals men's soccer players
Orlando City SC (2010–2014) players
American expatriate soccer players
Expatriate footballers in Sweden
Association football midfielders
Ljungskile SK players
FC Dallas draft picks
Soccer players from Illinois
People from Mundelein, Illinois